FC Mykolaiv is a football club based in Mykolaiv, Lvivska Oblast, Ukraine.

Overview
The club was originally called Tsementnyk-Khorda Mykolaiv and was supported by the cement factory in the town.

Tsementnyk-Khorda performed well at the Amateur Level in the 1996/97 season and finished Runners up in the competition. This was an entry criterion to the professional leagues and the following season the club entered the Druha Liha.

The club was competitive at that level for 4 seasons and then abruptly withdrew from the competition in 2001 after their sponsors decided not to fund the team.

Currently the club competes in the Lvivska Oblast competition.

Honors
Ukrainian football championship among amateurs
 Runners-up (1): 1996-97

Soviet Cup for collective teams of physical culture
 Finalists (1): 1970

Ukrainian Cup for collective teams of physical culture
 Finalists (1): 1979

Lviv Oblast football championship
 Winners (3): 1983, 1986, 1992
 Runners-up (2): 1979, 2013

Lviv Oblast Cup
 Holders (1): 1970

League and cup history

{|class="wikitable"
|-bgcolor="#efefef"
! Season
! Div.
! Pos.
! Pl.
! W
! D
! L
! GS
! GA
! P
!Domestic Cup
!colspan=2|Europe
!Notes
|-
|align=center|1997–98
|align=center|3rd "A"
|align=center|6
|align=center|34
|align=center|15
|align=center|6
|align=center|13
|align=center|34
|align=center|34
|align=center|51
|align=center|1/64 finals
|align=center|
|align=center|
|align=center|
|-
|align=center|1998–99
|align=center|3rd "A"
|align=center bgcolor=tan|3
|align=center|28
|align=center|16
|align=center|5
|align=center|7
|align=center|31
|align=center|24
|align=center|53
|align=center|1/32 finals
|align=center|
|align=center|
|align=center|
|-
|align=center|1999-00
|align=center|3rd "A"
|align=center|4
|align=center|30
|align=center|14
|align=center|8
|align=center|8
|align=center|38
|align=center|24
|align=center|50
|align=center|1/16 finals Second League Cup
|align=center|
|align=center|
|align=center|
|-
|align=center|2000–01
|align=center|3rd "A"
|align=center|5
|align=center|30
|align=center|16
|align=center|3
|align=center|11
|align=center|41
|align=center|29
|align=center|51
|align=center|1/8 finals Second League Cup
|align=center|
|align=center|
|align=center|
|-
|align=center|2001–02
|align=center|3rd "A"
|align=center|18
|align=center|36
|align=center|5
|align=center|3
|align=center|28
|align=center|18
|align=center|41
|align=center|31
|align=center|First Round
|align=center|
|align=center|
|align=center|Club withdraws
|-
|align=center|2002–
|align=center colspan=13|Club reforms and competes at the Amateur Level
|}

 
Football clubs in Lviv Oblast
Amateur football clubs in Ukraine
Sport in Mykolaiv, Lviv Oblast